Glen Ullin is a city in Morton County, North Dakota, United States. It is part of the "Bismarck, ND Metropolitan Statistical Area" or "Bismarck-Mandan". The population was 732 at the 2020 census.

History
Glen Ullin was founded in 1883 along the transcontinental route of the Northern Pacific Railway. The name was created by Major Alvan E. Bovay, a Northern Pacific land agent at the time.  Glen, the Scottish Gaelic word for "valley," was chosen because of the city's location within a valley, while Ullin was taken from the Thomas Campbell poem Lord Ullin's Daughter. Glen Ullin was originally built up chiefly by Germans from Russia.

Geography

Demographics

2010 census
As of the census of 2010, there were 807 people, 358 households, and 192 families residing in the city. The racial makeup of the city was 97.3% White, 0.5% Native American, 0.2% Asian, 0.2% Pacific Islander, 0.2% from other races, and 1.5% from two or more races. Hispanic or Latino of any race were 0.4% of the population.

There were 358 households, of which 20.4% had children under the age of 18 living with them, 45.8% were married couples living together, 5.6% had a female householder with no husband present, 2.2% had a male householder with no wife present, and 46.4% were non-families. 40.8% of all households were made up of individuals, and 21.7% had someone living alone who was 65 years of age or older. The average household size was 2.01 and the average family size was 2.74.

The median age in the city was 53.4 years. 17.3% of residents were under the age of 18; 4.1% were between the ages of 18 and 24; 18% were from 25 to 44; 26.3% were from 45 to 64; and 34.2% were 65 years of age or older. The gender makeup of the city was 46.2% male and 53.8% female.

2000 census
As of the census of 2000, there were 865 people, 369 households, and 221 families residing in the city. The population density was 831.2 people per square mile (321.1/km2). There were 405 housing units at an average density of 389.2 per square mile (150.4/km2). The racial makeup of the city was 99.42% White, 0.23% Native American, and 0.35% from two or more races.

There were 369 households, out of which 22.5% had children under the age of 18 living with them, 54.5% were married couples living together, 4.3% had a female householder with no husband present, and 40.1% were non-families. 37.9% of all households were made up of individuals, and 23.6% had someone living alone who was 65 years of age or older. The average household size was 2.08 and the average family size was 2.77.

In the city, the population was spread out, with 17.9% under the age of 18, 4.3% from 18 to 24, 19.2% from 25 to 44, 19.7% from 45 to 64, and 39.0% who were 65 years of age or older. The median age was 52 years. For every 100 females, there were 86.0 males. For every 100 females age 18 and over, there were 85.9 males.

The median income for a household in the city was $27,688, and the median income for a family was $32,368. Males had a median income of $24,444 versus $16,513 for females. The per capita income for the city was $16,258. About 4.4% of families and 8.3% of the population were below the poverty line, including 10.8% of those under age 18 and 12.3% of those age 65 or over.

Education

Glen Ullin currently operates a K-12 school located on the bypass on the south end of Glen Ullin.
Glen Ullin's school mascot is the "Bearcat". The school's nickname was previously the "Rattlers", until the school combined with Hebron high school and a name change took place. Glen Ullin's 1st co-op with Hebron, for football, had the team name of the "Bandits". Glen Ullin is currently combined in football with Beulah.

Notable people

 Ivan Dmitri, (1900 — 1968), artist and photographer, lived in Glen Ullin from 1914 to 1918

References

External links
 City website
 Glen Ullin yesteryears: a community built on dreams 1883-striving for the future-1983 from the Digital Horizons website

Cities in North Dakota
Cities in Morton County, North Dakota
Populated places established in 1883
1883 establishments in Dakota Territory